Mountbellew–Moylough (Irish: An Creagán/Maugh Locha) is a Gaelic Athletic Association club based in County Galway, Ireland. The club is a member of the Galway GAA. The club was formerly known as Mountbellew before amalgamating with Moylough.

On 14 November 2021, they won their first Galway Senior Club Football Championship title since 1986 with a win over reigning All-Ireland club champions Corofin.

Honours
Galway Senior Club Football Championships: 5
1964, 1965, 1974, 1986, 2021

Notable players
Joe Bergin
Enda Colleran
John Daly
Val Daly
Eoin Finnerty
Johnny Hughes
Patrick Kelly

References

External links
Mountbellew Moylough GAA Club Website

Gaelic football clubs in County Galway
Gaelic games clubs in County Galway